Ravinder Kumar may refer to:

Ravinder Kumar (historian) (1933-2001), Indian historian of Kashmiri descent
Ravinder Kumar Dhir, advisor to Gujarat state for Defence and Aerospace Industries
Ravinder Kumar Molhu (born Ravinder Kumar), Indian politician, member of the 15th and the 16th Legislative assemblies of Uttar Pradesh
Ravinder Kumar (politician) (aka Ravi Dhiman, born 1961)